Víctor Brown Rojas (born 7 March 1927, date of death unknown) was a Bolivian football forward who played for Bolivia in the 1950 FIFA World Cup. He also played for Club Litoral. Brown is deceased.

References

External links
FIFA profile

1927 births
Year of death missing
Bolivian footballers
Bolivia international footballers
Association football forwards
Club Deportivo Litoral (Cochabamba) players
1950 FIFA World Cup players